The Mdewakanton or Mdewakantonwan (also spelled Mdewákhaŋthuŋwaŋ and currently pronounced Bdewákhaŋthuŋwaŋ) are one of the sub-tribes of the Isanti (Santee) Dakota (Sioux).  Their historic home is Mille Lacs Lake (Dakota: Mde Wákhaŋ/Bde Wákhaŋ, Spirit/Mystic Lake) in central Minnesota.  Together with the Wahpekute (Waȟpékhute – "Shooters Among the Trees"), they form the so-called Upper Council of the Dakota or Santee Sioux (Isáŋyáthi – "Knife Makers"). Today their descendants are members of federally recognized tribes in Minnesota, South Dakota and Nebraska of the United States, and First Nations in Manitoba, Canada.

History

Tradition has it that the Mdewakanton were the leading tribe of Očhéthi Šakówiŋ. Their Siouan-speaking ancestors may have migrated to the upper Midwest from further south and east. Over the years they migrated up through present-day Ohio and into Wisconsin. Seven Sioux tribes formed an alliance, which they called Oceti Sakowin or Očhéthi Šakówiŋ ("The Seven Council Fires"), consisting of the four tribes of the Eastern Dakota, two tribes of the Western Dakota, as well as the largest group, the Lakota (often referred to as Teton, derived from Thítȟuŋwaŋ – "Dwellers of the Plains"). Facing competition from the Ojibwe and other Great Lakes Native American Algonquian-speaking tribes in the 1600s, the Santee moved further west into present-day Minnesota.

In 1687 Greysolon du Lhut recorded his visit to the "great village of the Nadouecioux, called Izatys". It was described as being on the southwestern shore of the eponymous Mde Wakan [Lake Mystery/Holy], now called Mille Lacs Lake, in north central Minnesota. Originally the term Santee was applied only to the Mdewakanton and later also to the closely related and allied Wahpekute. (As it was a nomadic group, it was not identified by the suffixes of  thuŋwaŋ – "settlers," or towan – "village"). Soon European settlers applied the name to all the tribes of the Eastern Dakota.

In the fall of 1837, the Mdewakantonwan negotiated a deal with the U.S. government under an "Indian Removal" treaty, whereby they were promised nearly one million dollars for all their lands east of the Mississippi River, including all islands in the river. Dwindling populations of game due to the American fur trade and the threat of starvation were motivators to the Mdewakanton to sign the treaty. Payment for the land was not received in one lump sum. Instead, the treaty stated that US$300,000 would be invested by the government and that the Mdewakanton would receive "annually, forever, an income of not less than five percent...a portion of said interest, not exceeding one third, to be applied in such manner as the President may direct." This discretionary fund worth $5,000 a year proved to be one of the most controversial parts of the treaty, as the government insisted that it had been allocated for educational programs for the Mdewakanton, but spent very little of the money over a period of fifteen years.

US reservations with Mdewakanton descendants 
The Mdewakantonwan traditionally consisted of decentralized villages led by different leaders and today, they maintain separate reservations with their own tribal government. In the United States, the Mdewakanton are counted among other Dakota and Yankton-Yanktonai bands as the Dakota:

South Dakota
 Crow Creek Sioux Tribe on Crow Creek Indian Reservation (Mdewakanton, Yankton, some Lower Yanktonai or Hunkpatina)
 Flandreau Santee Sioux Tribe on Flandreau Indian Reservation (Mdewakanton, Wahpekute, Wahpeton)

Minnesota
 Upper Sioux Community – Pejuhutazizi Oyate on Upper Sioux Indian Reservation (Pezihutazizi in Dakota) (Sisseton, Wahpeton, Mdewakanton)
 Lower Sioux Indian Community on Lower Sioux Indian Reservation (Mdewankanton Tribal Reservation) (Mdewakanton, Wahpekute)
 Shakopee Mdewakanton Sioux Community (also known as: Shakopee Mdewakanton Dakota Community or Shakopee Tribe) on Shakopee-Mdewakanton Indian Reservation (Mdewakanton, Wahpekute)
 Prairie Island Indian Community on Prairie Island Indian Community (Tinta Winta in Dakota) (Mdewakanton, Wahpekute)
 Mendota Mdewakanton Dakota Community (Mdewakanton-only community, is not federally recognized, but they are seeking recognition from the US Department of the Interior)

Some Mdewakanton in Minnesota live among Ojibwe people on the Mille Lacs Reservation as Mille Lacs Band of Mdewakanton Dakota, forming one of the historical bands that were amalgamated to become the Mille Lacs Band of Ojibwe.

Nebraska
 Santee Sioux Nation (also known as Santee Sioux Tribe of Nebraska) on Santee Sioux Reservation (Mdewakanton, Wahpekute)

First Nations with Mdewakanton descendants 
In Canada, the Mdewakanton live with members of other Dakota and Yanktonai band governments as Dakota peoples:

Manitoba
 Sioux Valley Dakota Nation on Sioux Valley Dakota Nation Reserve and Fishing Station 62A Reserve  (Sisseton, Wahpeton, some Mdewakanton and Wahpekute)
 Birdtail Sioux First Nation on Birdtail Creek 57 Reserve, Birdtail Hay Lands 57A Reserve, and on Fishing Station 62A Reserve (Mdewakanton, Wahpekute and some Yanktonai)

Some may live also within the White Bear First Nations, which consists mostly of members of the Plains Cree, Western Saulteaux and Assiniboine.

Historic tribes of the Mdewakanton
 Wakpaatonwedan division ("Those who dwell on the creek", "Dwellers on the creek"; one of the two early divisions of the Mdewakanton)
 real Wakpaatonwedan (lived along Rice creek, Minnesota)
 Kiyuska ("violators of custom", "rule breakers", lived below Lake Pepin, their main village Keoxa was at the side of today's Winona, Minnesota), led by a succession of chiefs with the name Wapasha
 Oyateshicha
 Titonwan or Tintaotonwe ("Village of the prairie", theirs was the largest Mdewakanton village, which was south of the Minnesota River and east of the present downtown of Shakopee, Minnesota), led by a succession of chiefs with the name Shakopee
 Ohanhanska
 Tacanhpisapa
 Anoginajin
 Matantonwan division ("village of the great lake which empties into a small one"; one of the two early divisions of the Mdewakanton, which early French writers spoke of as a powerful tribe associated with but not a part of the Mdewakanton)
 real Matantonwan (lived at the mouth of the Minnesota River)
 Pinisha or Pinichon (lived at Nine Mile creek on the north shore of the Minnesota River about nine miles above Fort Snelling, named after chief Pinisha, "Good Road")
 Kaposia or Kapozha kodozapuwa ("Those who travel with light burdens", "Light baggage", their village was closest to Fort Snelling on the Mississippi River a few miles south of the site of Saint Paul, Minnesota), led by famous chief Taoyateduta (Little Crow / Le Petite Corbeau)
 Khemnichan or Weakaote 
 Magayuteshni
 Mahpiyamaza or Makhpiyamaza (their village was in the 1850s on the west side of the Mississippi River above the mouth of St. Croix near the present site of Hastings, Minnesota, named after the chief Makhpiyamaza, "Iron Cloud")
 Mahpiyawichasta (lived in the vicinity of today's Chain of Lakes, later established a permanent village few miles west of Fort Snelling on the eastern shore of Mde/Bde Maka Ska - "White Earth Lake", later called Mde Medoza − "Lake of the Loons" (renamed Lake Calhoun), band was named after its war chief Marpiyawicasta, "Man of the Clouds", or Makh-pea Wechashta, "Cloud Man")
 Kheyataotonwe or Kay-yah-ta Otonwa ("Village whose houses have roofs", presumably identical with a village of the same name of chief Marpiyawicasta, "Man of the Clouds")
 Reyata otonwe or Reyata Otonwa ("People who live back from the river", i.e. "Minnesota River", village at Lake Bde Maka Ska)
 Taoapa or  Tewapa (at Eagle creek)

Only the Kiyuska, Pinisha, Reyata otonwe/Reyata Otonwa and real Matantonwan bands survive as organized groups today.

See also

 Chief Wabasha II
 Chief Wabasha III
 Mille Lacs Indians
 Mille Lacs Lake
 Rum River
 Snana
 Tamaha (Dakota scout)
 Taoyateduta

Citations

General references 
 Hodge, Frederick Webb (1906). "Mdewakanton Indian Chiefs and Leaders." The Handbook of American Indians North of Mexico. Bureau of American Ethnology, Government Printing Office.
 Williamson, John P. (1902). An English-Dakota Dictionary. New York: American Tract Society.

External links
 Flandreau Santee Sioux Tribe
 Lower Sioux Indian Community
 Mendota Mdewakanton Dakota Tribal Community
 Prairie Island Indian Community
 Shakopee Mdewakanton Sioux Community
 Sioux Valley First Nation
 Upper Sioux Community

Great Lakes tribes
Native American history of Minnesota
Native American tribes in Minnesota